Denis Browne may refer to:

Denis Browne (bishop) (born 1937), New Zealand bishop
Denis Browne (priest) (1796–1864), Dean of Emly, 1850–1864
Denis Browne (politician) (1763–1828), Irish politician
Denis Browne, 10th Marquess of Sligo (1908–1991), Irish peer
Denis Browne (surgeon) (1892–1967), Australian-born British surgeon

See also
Dennis Brian Browne, Canadian diplomat
William Denis Browne (1888–1915), British composer
Dennis Brown (disambiguation)
Denis Browne bar, medical device for the treatment of clubfoot